Soulstice is a downtempo/electronic soul band that is a part of the US based record label Om Records and later to Uno Recordings. The band started after a collaboration between Gabriel Rene and Andy Caldwell in 1995. The band was composed of Gina Rene (vocals), Gabriel Rene (keyboards), Mei-Lwun (DJ turntable) and Andy Caldwell (keyboards and producer).

Gina and Gabriel Rene are the sister and brother of US The X Factor season 1 contestant and second runner-up Chris Rene. Andy Caldwell has gone on to perform solo and producing artists through Uno Recordings, a music producing label that he established in 2004.

Soulstice has released three albums: Illusion (2001), its accompanying remix album Mixed Illusions (2001), and In the Light (2011).

Discography

They released the album Mixed Illusions in 2001.

After almost a decade long hiatus, the album In The Light was released on May 17, 2011.

References

External links
Soulstice MySpace
Soulstice on LastFM

American soul musical groups
Electronic music groups from California
Trip hop groups
American electronic music groups
Downtempo musicians